Felipe Santiago Gutiérrez (20 May 1824, Texcoco - 4 April 1904, Texcoco) was a Mexican painter, known primarily for portraits. He also worked in Colombia, for twenty years.

Life and career
After completing his primary education in his hometown, in 1836, he enrolled at the Academia de San Carlos in Mexico City, where he studied with the Catalonian painter Pelegrí Clavé. From 1848, he was a resident of Toluca. Between 1848 and 1854 he travelled throughout the countryside as a teacher for the Literary Institute (now the Autonomous University of Mexico State). 

Later, he embarked on several study trips; notably to the United States (1868-1872), followed by Rome, Paris, Madrid (where he worked briefly with Federico de Madrazo), Barcelona, Florence and others. In 1873, he visited New York, where he met the Colombian writer and diplomat, Rafael Pombo, who invited him to Bogotá, where he stayed for many years. While there, in 1886, he helped to create the National School of Fine Arts. While in Paris, he had studied nude painting and, in 1891, when his "Huntress of the Andes" was displayed in Mexico, it created a small scandal.

He returned to his hometown in 1894 and died there in 1904.

In December 1992, the Museo Felipe Santiago Gutiérrez opened in Toluca. It contains 225 works by Gutiérrez and his followers; arranged by themes. It shares space with a museum devoted to  José María Velasco Gómez. His works may also be seen at several museums in Bogotá, as well as the Museo Nacional de Arte.

Selected paintings

References

Further reading
 Felipe S. Gutiérrez, pintor de Academia Tezcoco, 1824-1904, José Manuel Caballero-Barnard (ed.), Artes de México #171, 1960
 Felipe Santiago Gutiérrez: Pasión y destino, (exhibition catalog) Instituto Mexiquense de Cultura, 1993 
 Maria Cristina Garcia Cepeda, Lidia Camacho Camacho and Roberto Hernandez, Discursos de la piel : Felipe Santiago Gutierrez (1824-1904), Museo Nacional de Arte Ciudad de Mexico, 2017

External links

Museo Felipe Santiago Gutiérrez @ Mexico es Cultura
Museo Felipe Santiago Gutiérrez @ State of Mexico, Secretary of Culture

1824 births
1904 deaths
Mexican painters
Mexican portrait painters
Academy of San Carlos alumni